"I Changed My Mind" is a song by American R&B recording artist Keyshia Cole, recorded for her debut album, The Way It Is (2005). It was written by the singer along with John Legend and Kanye West, while production on the track was helmed by the latter. Released on November 9, 2004 as the lead single from the album, it was mildly successful commercially, peaking at number 71 on the US Billboard Hot 100 and number 23 on the Hot R&B/Hip-Hop Songs charts.

There was a remix to the song that featured rapper Shyne, who was incarcerated. This version made its way to radio airplay format, while the video version does not have Shyne in it. Vocals from Solomon Burke's "Get Out of My Life, Woman" are used throughout, although "I Changed My Mind" actually samples "The Chronic (Intro)" by Dr. Dre, in which Burke's sample is already embedded (Dr. Dre can be heard over the top of the sample saying "Yeah nigga...").

Background
Keyshia Cole wrote the song verse, John Legend wrote the bridge, and Kanye West wrote the vocals as well as produced it. The song also has background vocals by Legend. As are most of her songs, Keyshia wrote this about an ex-boyfriend. As her boyfriend has another girl on the side, he does not pay attention to Cole. She finds out about her, and "changes her mind", that she doesn't want to be with him anymore. She then goes on in the bridge, singing to him "I don't care if you come back to me on your knees, I just don't love you no more."

Chart performance
"I Changed My Mind" debuted on the US Billboard Hot 100 at number 72, the highest debut of all Cole's singles. As a CD single release, it achieved "greatest retail gainer" status for two weeks. The song lingered in the bottom quarter of the Hot 100 for 2 months, eventually peaking at number 71. "I Changed My Mind" also peaked at number 23 on the US Hot R&B/Hip-Hop Songs.

Music video

The music video for "I Changed My Mind" was directed by Nzingha Stewart and filmed in Cole's hometown, Oakland, California on June 30, 2004. In the beginning, the video has various screenshots of different places in the Bay Area and has a resemblance of Mary J. Blige's 1993 Video of You Remind Me. In the video, Cole has a boyfriend whom she loves, but obviously finds out that he is cheating on her. She gets very upset and confronts him. She leaves him, and quickly moves on. The video features Kanye West and shows Shyne's promo CD "More or Less", He is featured on the Remix of this single. It was first seen as the "New Joint of the Week" on BET's 106 & Park on August 13, 2004.

Promotion
Cole first performed "I Changed My Mind" during friend and producer Kanye West's set on Usher's Truth Tour (2004).

Track listings

Notes
  signifies an additional producer

Credits and personnel 
Credits adapted from the liner notes of The Way It Is.

 Keyshia Cole – vocals, writer
 Ron Fair – additional producer
 Manny Halley – executive producer
 Tal Herzberg – additional producer, engineer
 Jun Ishizeki – engineer
 Anthony Kilhoffer – engineer
 John Legend – writer
 Dave Pensado – mixing engineer
Kanye West – producer

Charts

References

2004 singles
Keyshia Cole songs
Kanye West songs
Song recordings produced by Kanye West
Songs written by John Legend
Songs written by Kanye West
Songs written by Keyshia Cole
2004 songs
A&M Records singles